Matthew 17 is the seventeenth chapter in the Gospel of Matthew in the New Testament section of the Christian Bible. Jesus continues his final journey to Jerusalem ministering through Galilee. William Robertson Nicoll identifies "three impressive tableaux" in this chapter: the transfiguration, the epileptic boy and the temple tribute.

Locations
The chapter opens six days after the events of the previous chapter, which take place in the region of Caesarea Philippi, near the southwestern base of Mount Hermon. Matthew in verse  states that Jesus must go to Jerusalem, but this journey does not properly begin until . With Peter, James and John, he goes to a high mountain, traditionally understood and commemorated as Mount Tabor, where he is transfigured. Mount Tabor is in the south of Galilee. By verse 14 they have returned to a location where the crowd is gathered, verse 22 notes that they are still in Galilee, and in verse 24 they have returned to Capernaum at the northern end of the Sea of Galilee.

James Burton Coffman suggests that the location of the transfiguration would have been either Mount Hermon, closer to Caesarea Philippi, "or one of its adjacent peaks": "Mount Tabor, in the days of Christ and the apostles was populated and had a fortress on top of it; and Christ's taking his apostles there would not have been taking them 'apart', as Matthew said" (Matthew 17:1 in the King James Version), nor was Mount Tabor a particularly "high" mountain.

Text
The original text was written in Koine Greek. This chapter is divided into 27 verses.

Textual witnesses

Some early manuscripts containing the text of this chapter are:
Codex Vaticanus (AD 325-350; no verse 21)
Codex Sinaiticus (330-360; no verse 21)
Codex Bezae (c. 400; complete)
Codex Washingtonianus (c. 400; complete)
Codex Ephraemi Rescriptus (c. 450; extant verses 1-25)
Codex Purpureus Rossanensis (6th century)
Codex Sinopensis (6th century; extant verses 2-24)
Papyrus 44 (6th/7th century; extant verses 1-3, 6-7)

Chapter organisation
The New King James Version organises this chapter as follows:
Jesus transfigured on the Mount
A Boy is Healed
Jesus Again Predicts His Death and Resurrection
Peter and His Master Pay Their Taxes

Transfiguration of Jesus (17:1–8)

The first eight verses of this chapter record the account of the Transfiguration of Jesus, an event where Jesus is transfigured and becomes radiant in glory on top of a mountain. The passage has parallels in other Synoptic Gospels— and — and the event is referred to in the Second Epistle of Peter as well as possibly alluded in the first chapter of the Gospel of John (John 1:14).

Verse 1
Now after six days Jesus took Peter, James, and John his brother, led them up on a high mountain by themselves.
In Luke's gospel, the account of the transfiguration of Jesus comes about eight days after the previous events. Protestant theologian Heinrich Meyer notes, in accordance with the observations of "Chrysostom, Jerome, Theophylact, Erasmus, and many others ... that Luke has included the dies a quo and ad quem" (i.e. inclusive of the days at the start and end of the interval).

Verse 2
And He was transfigured before them. His face shone like the sun, and His clothes became as white as the light.
Some versions state "white as snow" rather than "white as the light". The Jerusalem Bible notes that the angel of the resurrection in Matthew 28:3 wore a robe which was "white as snow".

Coin in the fish's mouth (17:24–27)

The four-drachma (or shekel) coin would be exactly enough to pay the temple tax (a two-drachma coin) for two people. It is usually thought to be a Tyrian shekel.

See also

 Related Bible parts: Exodus 30, Exodus 38, Mark 9, Luke 9

References

Sources

External links
 King James Bible - Wikisource
English Translation with Parallel Latin Vulgate
Online Bible at GospelHall.org (ESV, KJV, Darby, American Standard Version, Bible in Basic English)
Multiple bible versions at Bible Gateway (NKJV, NIV, NRSV etc.)

Gospel of Matthew chapters